Ariste may refer to:

Ariste, Saaremaa Parish, village in Saaremaa Parish, Saare County, Estonia
Valjala-Ariste (formerly known as Ariste), village in Saaremaa Parish, Saare County, Estonia
Paul Ariste (1905–1990), Estonian linguist